Illusory contours or subjective contours are visual illusions that evoke the perception of an edge without a luminance or color change across that edge. Illusory brightness and depth ordering often accompany illusory contours. Friedrich Schumann is often credited with the discovery of illusory contours around the beginning of the 20th century, but they are present in art dating to the Middle Ages. Gaetano Kanizsa’s 1976 Scientific American paper marked the resurgence of interest in illusory contours for vision scientists.

Common types of illusory contours

Kanizsa figures
Perhaps the most famous example of an illusory contour is the Pac-Man configuration popularized by Gaetano Kanizsa.

Kanizsa figures trigger the percept of an illusory contour by aligning Pac-Man-shaped inducers in the visual field such that the edges form a shape. Although not explicitly part of the image, Kanizsa figures evoke the percept of a shape, defined by a sharp illusory contour.

Typically, the shape seems brighter than the background, even though the luminance is in reality homogeneous. Additionally, the illusory shape seem to be closer to the viewer than the inducers. Kanizsa figures involve modal completion of the illusory shape and amodal completion of the inducers.

Ehrenstein illusion

 

Closely related to Kanizsa figures is the Ehrenstein illusion. Instead of employing Pac-Man inducers, the Ehrenstein illusion triggers an illusory contour percept via radial line segments. Ehrenstein's discovery was originally contextualized as a modification of the Hermann grid.

Abutting line gratings
Illusory contours are created at the boundary between two misaligned gratings. In these so-called abutting line gratings, the illusory contour is perpendicular to the inducing elements.

In art and graphic design
Olympic logos from 1972, 1984, 1988, and 1994 all feature illusory contours, as does Ellsworth Kelly's 1950s series.

Jacob Gestman Geradts often used the Kanizsa illusion in his silkscreen prints, for instance in his work Formula 1 (1991).

Cortical responses
It is thought that early visual cortical regions such as V1 V2 in the visual system are responsible for forming illusory contours. Studies using human neuroimaging techniques have found that illusory contours are associated with activity in the deep layers of primary visual cortex.

Related visual phenomena

Visual illusions are useful stimuli for studying the neural basis of perception because they hijack the visual system's innate mechanisms for interpreting the visual world under normal conditions. For example, objects in the natural world are often only partially visible. Illusory contours provide clues for how the visual system constructs surfaces when portions of the surface's edge are not visible.

The encoding of surfaces is thought to be an indispensable part of visual perception, forming a critical intermediate stage of visual processing between the initial analysis of visual features and the ability to recognize complex stimuli like faces and scenes.

Amodal perception
Autostereogram
Filling-in
Gestalt psychology
Negative space
Phantom contour
Reification

References

Further reading

External links
Illusory contours figures Many unpublished drawings (fr)

Optical illusions
Triangles